April Fool is a 2014 Indian Telugu-language comedy film directed by Krishnaswamy Shrikanth Iyengar and starring Ranadhir Reddy with Jagapathi Babu and Bhumika Chawla in supporting roles. The film was released on 10 May 2014.

Cast 
Ranadhir Reddy as Kakki 
Jagapathi Babu as Prakash (extended cameo appearance)
Bhumika Chawla as Swapna  (extended cameo appearance)
Gulshan Grover as Anna

Production 
The film was shot in forty-six days.

Reception 
A critic from The Times of India wrote that "The film, we were told, was going to be an absurd comedy. It's only half true...the absurd part that is". A critic from 123telugu wrote that "On the whole, April Fool is one film which will make a total fool of your senses".  A critic from India Herald wrote that "If you are not bothered by bad screenplay and acting, love Bhumika Chawla and have money to spend this weekend then go watch April Fool".

References